Tom Kirk may refer to:

 Tom Kirk (rugby league) (1916–1994), Australian rugby league footballer
 Tom Kirk (cricketer) (born 1992), cricketer for Guernsey
 Tom Kirk (baseball) (1927–1974), baseball player with the Philadelphia Athletics

See also 
 Thomas Kirk (disambiguation)
 Tommy Kirk (1941–2021), American former actor and later a businessman